Chmielnik  is a town in Kielce County, Świętokrzyskie Voivodeship, Poland. As of December 2021, it has a population of 3,557, and lies in historic Lesser Poland. The name of the town is derived from hop.

History

Chmielnik was first mentioned in connection with the Battle of Chmielnik with Mongols and Tatars fought in the area in 1241 (see Mongol invasion of Poland). The Mongols and the Tatars were opposed near the settlement by Polish knights from the provinces of Sandomierz and Kraków. In the town there is a monument dedicated to this battle. At the beginning the settlement was a property of the dukes of Sandomierz, but in the 13th century it became owned by the Odrowąż family. The oldest monument in the town is the Church of Holy Trinity together with a church graveyard from around 1356. Later on Chmielnik belonged to the Oleśnicki family who made efforts to grant it town charter. In 1551 Chmielnik was granted Magdeburg town rights by king Sigismund II Augustus, hereby formally becoming a town. In 1580 king Stephen Báthory granted the town a privilege of organizing more fairs. At the beginning of the 17th century the ownership of the town was transferred to the Gołuchowski family.

In the 16th and 17th centuries the town was a major centre of Polish Protestants (Calvinists and the Polish Brethren). On the basis of privilege granted by Krzysztof Gołuchowski in the second part of the 17th century the town was populated by Sephardi Jews expelled from Spain. They built a synagogue in 1638  and took over houses and shops of the Polish Brethren expelled from the town in 1658. In 1787 Chmielnik became a property of the Chłapowski family. After the Third Partition of Poland the town was taken by the Habsburg Empire (1795). In the years 1809–1815 it was in the Duchy of Warsaw, later in the Russian-controlled Congress Poland (1815–1915). In 1829 Dezydery, the last of the Chłapowski family, sold the town to Kazimierz Tański, a Polish general who participated in the Kościuszko Uprising and Polish national liberation struggles in the early 19th century. It was in the hands of this family until 1945. On January 20, 1864 a battle of the Polish January Uprising against the Russians was fought in Chmielnik.

Before the Second World War, over 80% of the 12,000 inhabitants were Jews. After capturing the town in 1939 the Germans slowly discriminated against the Polish and Jewish population, which swelled during the war as Jews fled from other towns arrived at Chmielnik. Over several months Germans transported Jews to concentration camps, mainly Treblinka, where they were exterminated. The Germans also deported over 1,600 people for forced labor, and, still in Chmielnik, carried out executions of Poles and Jews from the town as well as from other places. The Polish resistance movement was active in the area, secret Polish teaching was organized.

Just after the war, only four Jewish residents residing in the town had survived. The remaining Holocaust survivors emigrated, mostly to Israel, Canada and the United States. There is renewed interest in Chmielnik's Jewish heritage although no Jew has lived there for decades. The synagogue has been renovated and transformed into a museum to the memory of the Jews of the region.

Demographics 

Detailed data as of 31 December 2021:

Number of inhabitants by year

Sports 
Chmielnik is home to a sports club Zenit, established in 1946.

Notable people 

 Herbert Klarman (1916–1999), American economist

 Angelyne (born 1950), American model, singer, and pop culture icon.

References

External links
 History of Chmielnik

Cities and towns in Świętokrzyskie Voivodeship
Kielce County
Kielce Governorate
Kielce Voivodeship (1919–1939)
Holocaust locations in Poland